Praseodymium arsenate is the arsenate salt of praseodymium, with the chemical formula of PrAsO4. It has good thermal stability. Its ferroelectric transition temperature is 52°C.

Preparation

Praseodymium arsenate be prepared by reacting sodium arsenate (Na3AsO4) and praseodymium chloride (PrCl3) in a solution:

 Na3AsO4 + PrCl3 → 3 NaCl + PrAsO4↓

The product can also be obtained by reacting praseodymium(III,IV) oxide and diammonium hydrogen arsenate in hot dilute nitric acid in a stoichiometric ratio.

References 

Praseodymium compounds
Arsenates